Kobus Scholtz (born 16 October 1992) is a South African cricketer. He made his first-class debut on 8 December 2011, for South Western Districts in the 2011–12 CSA Provincial Three-Day Challenge. He made his List A debut on 29 January 2012, for South Western Districts in the 2011–12 CSA Provincial One-Day Challenge.

References

External links
 

1992 births
Living people
South African cricketers
Boland cricketers
South Western Districts cricketers
Place of birth missing (living people)